Patrick Jérôme Achi (born 17 November 1955) is an Ivorian politician who serves as Prime Minister of Ivory Coast since March 2021. A member of the Rally of the Republicans, he studied at Supélec and Stanford University and specialises in engineering and infrastructure. He has also worked as the government spokesman for President Alassane Ouattara.

Early life and education
Achi, born in Paris to an Ivorian father (from the Attié tribe located in the South region) and a French Breton mother. He was educated in France and the United States.

Career
Between 2010 and 2017, Achi was Minister of Economic Infrastructure for the governments of successive Prime Ministers Guillaume Soro (2010–2012), Jeannot Ahoussou-Kouadio (2012) and Daniel Kablan Duncan (2012–2017).

Achi was appointed acting prime minister on 8 March 2021 to assume the duties of Prime Minister Hamed Bakayoko, who had been hospitalized. Bakayoko died two days later. Achi was appointed as the Prime Minister on 26 March 2021 by President Ouattara. In this capacity, he emerged as a key figure in discussions to resolve a large power generation deficit that had strained electricity supplies in urban areas for several weeks.

In October 2021, his name was mentioned in the Pandora Papers. He controlled (at least until 2006) Allstar Consultancy Services Limited, an offshore company located in the Bahamas and created in 1998 through a nominee, while Achi was government commissioner with the Ivorian Electricity Company (CIE) and technical advisor to the Minister of Energy.

On 13 April 2022, he and his government resigned. On 19 April, he was reappointed as Prime Minister by President Ouattara but with a cabinet reshuffle and the formation of a second government.

Other activities
 International Monetary Fund (IMF), ex officio Member of the Board of Governors

Personal life
On 16 April 2020, Achi announced that he had tested positive for COVID-19 and was self-isolating until further notice. In May 2021, he was flown to Paris due to "severe fatigue" and for medical checks. He has 5 children.

References

1955 births
Living people
Democratic Party of Côte d'Ivoire – African Democratic Rally politicians
Government ministers of Ivory Coast
Heads of government of Ivory Coast
Ivorian expatriates in the United States
People named in the Pandora Papers
Ivorian people of Breton descent
Ivorian people of French descent
Stanford University alumni
21st-century Ivorian politicians